Montana Rail Link  is  a privately held Class II railroad in the United States. It operates on trackage originally built by the Northern Pacific Railway and leased from its successor BNSF.  MRL is a unit of The Washington Companies and is headquartered in Missoula, Montana.

The railroad runs between Huntley, Montana and Spokane, Washington, largely within Montana, and the main line passes through the towns of Missoula, Livingston, Bozeman, Billings, and Helena. Montana Rail Link connects with the BNSF on both ends and also in Garrison, Montana. The main classification yard is in Laurel, Montana, with smaller yards in Missoula, Billings, Bozeman and Helena. Repair and mechanical facilities are in Livingston, Montana; turntables remain in Livingston and Laurel.

In January 2022, MRL and BNSF agreed on an early lease termination to return control of the line to BNSF. This was later approved by the Surface Transportation Board on March 8, 2023.

History
Montana Rail Link's present status and main line date back to October 31, 1987, when MRL under Missoula businessman Dennis Washington commenced a 60-year lease of Burlington Northern's southern Montana main line between Sandpoint, Idaho and Huntley, Montana, near Billings. This spin-off was controversial as it happened during contract negotiations between Burlington Northern and the United Transportation Union. MRL workers are represented by various unions. Montana Rail Link trains operate between Billings and Spokane using trackage rights over BN successor BNSF's tracks connecting those points. 

Montana Rail Link still uses cabooses, which are used to carry remote control switching equipment on Laurel switch engines. A significant number of MRL movements are actually BNSF trains, complete with locomotives, that MRL receives at one end of its track and forwards back to BNSF at the other end. MRL also operates trains of its own to gather and distribute local freight along its lines. Forest products and grain are primary commodities, and MRL also operates a special train, called the Gas Local, between Missoula and Thompson Falls, Montana, to bridge a gap in a long-distance gasoline pipeline.

On September 8, 2005, Montana Rail Link took delivery of locomotive number 4300, the first of 16 new EMD SD70ACe locomotives. This was the first locomotive that the railroad has ordered new from a manufacturer, and it and the rest of the class were intended to replace aging SD40 and SD45 locomotives on trains crossing the Rocky Mountains over the continental divide at Mullan Pass near Helena, Montana and Bozeman Pass near Bozeman, Montana.

In January 2022, BNSF agreed to pay MRL $2 billion for an early lease termination. The return to BNSF control will require the approval of the Surface Transportation Board before taking effect.

1989 Helena Train Wreck
One of the most severe accidents in MRL history was the Helena Train Wreck of February 2, 1989, when 48 decoupled rail cars rolled into Helena, hit a parked work train, caught fire and exploded. While property damage was extensive, there were no casualties.

2014 Alberton derailment

On July 3, 2014, a MRL train with 90 railcars derailed near Alberton, Montana, en route from Laurel, Montana to Spokane, Washington. Twenty cars derailed, including three containing hazardous materials and six Boeing 737 fuselages. The 737 fuselages had been built in Kansas at Spirit AeroSystems and were being shipped to Renton, Washington, for final assembly. Three of the fuselages fell down an embankment, with two reaching the Clark Fork River. The six fuselages were recovered and scrapped within the month.

References

External links

Official website

Regional railroads in the United States
Idaho railroads
Montana railroads
Washington (state) railroads
Spin-offs of the Burlington Northern Railroad
Railway companies established in 1987

1987 establishments in Montana